Dmitri Sergeyevich Kagarlitsky (born August 1, 1989) is a Russian professional ice hockey right winger currently playing for Ak Bars Kazan of the Kontinental Hockey League (KHL).

Playing career
Kagarlitsky formerly played for four seasons with Severstal Cherepovets, before leaving as a free agent at the conclusion of the 2017–18 campaign, to sign a one-year contract as a free agent with his fifth KHL club, Dynamo Moscow, on May 17, 2018.

After a season stint with SKA Saint Petersburg in 2019–20, Kagarlitsky was returned to Dynamo Moscow in a trade on 1 June 2020.

As a free agent, Kagarlitsky left Dynamo and signed a one-year contract with Ak Bars Kazan on 24 May 2021.

References

External links

1989 births
Living people
Ak Bars Kazan players
Atlant Moscow Oblast players
HC Donbass players
HC Dynamo Moscow players
Krylya Sovetov Moscow players
Metallurg Novokuznetsk players
Russian ice hockey right wingers
HC Ryazan players
Severstal Cherepovets players
People from Cherepovets
SKA Saint Petersburg players
Sportspeople from Vologda Oblast